Sumya Anani (born February 12, 1972) is a retired American professional female boxer nicknamed "The Island Girl." She was 5'6" and boxed as a junior welterweight. She is best known for a 1996 bout which left her opponent severely injured and may have served as an inspiration for the film Million Dollar Baby. Outside the ring, she is a yoga instructor and holistic healer.

Anani was born in Minnesota and raised in Kansas. She competed as a weightlifter in 1995 and 1996. She took up boxing for self-defense and started boxing professionally because she was "short on cash." She began to box professionally in the summer of 1996.

She began by boxing against relatively unknown opponents. Her fourth professional bout was in St. Joseph, Missouri against Katie Dallam, a novice welterweight who had only gotten her pro boxing license the day before — a pairing described as "an obvious mismatch." In four rounds she landed 119 blows to Dallam's head. Dallam collapsed in her dressing room afterward and required brain surgery. Anani was so upset she considered quitting boxing.

She came to prominence in the boxing world on September 30, 1997, when she defeated former WIBF lightweight champion Stacy Prestage by a knockout. On March 28, 1998 she scored "the sport's biggest upset" with a unanimous six-round decision over veteran Andrea DeShong, considered "the standard bearer for the sport." On December 18, 1998, she fought boxing star Christy Martin and won the match, handing Martin her first defeat since November 1989.

In 2016, Anani was inducted into the Women's International Boxing Hall of Fame in Fort Lauderdale, Florida.  The IWBHF was created and founded by Sue TL Fox.

Professional boxing record

See also
 List of female boxers

References

External links
 Sumya Anani at Awakening Fighters

1972 births
Living people
American women boxers
Boxers from Minnesota
Boxers from Kansas
Welterweight boxers
21st-century American women